= Praveen Mayakar =

- Born: Praveen Mayakar; 8 January 1981 (age 45); Dharwad, Karnataka, India.
- Occupation: Music producer
- Years active: 2010–present
- Website: https://www.mayaswara.com

Praveen Mayakar (born 8 January 1981) is an Indo-Swedish music producer, composer, singer-songwriter based in Stockholm, Sweden. He had been composing music since 2010 with a band and independent record label called MayaSwara, with a vision to support independent artists. He is also a writer, poet and photographer.

== Career ==
In 2016 Mayakar began publishing his poetry. His first book was a collection of poetry in Kannada that he began at the age of 8. His interest in music lead him to pursue the role of a musician and a music producer since 2010. He has released eight albums as of 2018.

== Discography ==
=== Albums ===
- Annoyances (2010)
- Annoyances 2 (2010)
- Ignorances (2011)
- Acceptances (2012)
- Appearances (2012)
- Best of MayaSwara (2013)
- Experiences (2013)
- Grievances (2016)
